Bagan Nakhoda Omar is a mukim and a town in Sabak Bernam District, Selangor, Malaysia.

It is the westernmost and northernmost point of Selangor.

References

Mukims of Selangor
Sabak Bernam District